Gilmer County Schools is the operating school district within Gilmer County, West Virginia. It is governed by the Gilmer County Board of Education. Gilmer County Schools operates one elementary school, which serves students through grade 5, and one high school, which serves students in grades 6-12.

Board of Education
The Gilmer County Board of Education is made up of the following members:
Cody Moore, President
Dustin Freshour, Vice-President
Brett Chapman, Member
Hilary Miller, Member
Jason Barr, Member

Schools

Secondary School
Gilmer County High School, Glenville

Elementary School
Gilmer County Elementary School, Glenville

Vocational School
Calhoun-Gilmer Career Center (jointly operated by Gilmer and Calhoun County Schools)

References

External links

School districts in West Virginia
Education in Gilmer County, West Virginia